Blaise Diagne International Airport is an international airport near the town of Diass in Thiès Region, Senegal,  east of downtown Dakar. It serves as the main airport for Dakar, replacing Léopold Sédar Senghor International Airport, which had become too small. It is named after Blaise Diagne, the first black African elected to France's parliament in 1914. Regular flights are operated from it to destinations across many parts of Africa, as well as to Europe, Macaronesia, the Middle East, and the USA.

History 

The airport was originally expected to be operational at the end of the year 2011, but this date was pushed back by almost a year in September of that year. 
In September 2012, Senegalese Prime Minister Abdoul Mbaye announced that the airport would open in the first quarter of 2014.
In January 2015, word spread that the airport would open in June 2015. On April 4, 2015 Reuters announced a new opening date for early 2016.

The expected building costs rose to 566 million euros, with over 400 million coming from the Saudi Binladin Group.

The airport finally opened for scheduled operations on December 7, 2017.

Airlines and destinations

Passenger 
The following airlines operate regular scheduled and charter flights at Dakar Blaise Diagne Airport:

Cargo

Statistics

Ground transportation
The Train Express Regional is a rail-link between the airport and Dakar. The first phase, linking downtown Dakar and Diamniadio, opened on 14 January 2019.. As of January 2023, the rails and station that will serve the airport are under construction.

References

External links 

 Official website

Airports in Senegal
Airports established in 2017
2017 establishments in Senegal
Thiès Region